Love and War (Arabic:حب و حرب) is an Iraqi TV series directed by Jamal Abed jassim and starring Iraqi actors Qasim Al-malak and Naghem Alsultany

References

Iraqi drama television series
2003 Iraqi television series debuts
2000s Iraqi television series